Dicer: The Unheard Funk Tracks is a compilation of unreleased studio tracks, rarities, and live performances by Pittsburgh-based alternative hip hop group, Grand Buffet.

Track listing

References

Grand Buffet albums
2004 compilation albums